The Lachsbach, also called the Rathmannsdorfer Bach, is a river of Saxony, Germany. It is the largest, right-hand tributary of the Elbe in Saxon Switzerland.

Geography
The Lachsbach is formed by the merger of its headstreams, the Sebnitz (left, about half the size) and Polenz (right, rather longer) in the Elbe Sandstone Mountains near Porschdorf. The combined confluence section of the two rivers was first recorded in 1543 as die beyde wasser ("the two waters"), a description no longer common today. After only , the Lachsbach empties into the Elbe above Prossen's winter port near Wendischfähre.

See also
List of rivers of Saxony

References

Rivers of Saxony
Bodies of water of Saxon Switzerland
Rivers of Germany